Christ Church, Ward End is a Grade II listed parish church in the Church of England in Birmingham.

History
 
 
The land on which the church was built was given by the Metropolitan Cammell Carriage and Wagon Company in the late 1920s. The first sod was cut on 4 March 1934 by Revd. W.E. Dugmore, vicar of St Margaret's Church, Ward End. The foundation stone was laid on 12 May 1934 by Rt. Revd Ernest Barnes Bishop of Birmingham in a ceremony conducted with Masonic rites, Freemasons being present from various lodges in the Warwickshire Province.

The church was built to designs by the architect Holland W. Hobbiss by the firm of William Deacon and Son of Lichfield. It was consecrated by Rt. Revd Ernest Barnes Bishop of Birmingham on 29 June 1935.

The church contains two sculptures by William Bloye.

The side chapel was fitted out in 1951 with panelling and an altar from St Stephen the Martyr's Church, Newtown Row. It became a parish in its own right on 28 May 1965.

The church hall was built in 1968 to designs of the architect Noel Hastilow.

In 2005, St Margaret's Church, Ward End was closed, and the parish was merged with Christ Church.

Organ

The organ dates from 1948 and was built by Alfred E. Davies & Son Ltd. A specification of the organ can be found on the National Pipe Organ Register.

References

Church of England church buildings in Birmingham, West Midlands
Churches completed in 1935
20th-century Church of England church buildings
Grade II listed buildings in Birmingham
Grade II listed churches in the West Midlands (county)